Chasmoptera huttii (common name – spoon winged lacewing) is an insect in the spoonwing family (Nemopteridae). found in Western Australia.

It was first described in 1848 by John Obadiah Westwood as Nemoptera huttii. The original species epithet, Huttii, honours John Hutt, governor of Western Australia (1839–1846).

The adults are diurnal flying insects.

Gallery

References

External links
Chasmoptera huttii: images & occurrence data from GBIF

Insects of Australia
Nemopteridae
Insects described in 1848
Taxa named by John O. Westwood